is a Japanese politician of the Democratic Party of Japan, a member of the House of Councillors in the Diet (national legislature). A native of Kagoshima Prefecture and high school graduate, he was elected for the first time in 2007. He is the father of professional golfer Sakura Yokomine.

References

External links 
 Official website in Japanese.

Members of the House of Councillors (Japan)
1960 births
People from Kanoya, Kagoshima
Living people
Democratic Party of Japan politicians